Phyllis Jean Benjamin  (30 August 1907 – 9 April 1996), Labor Party politician, was a member of the  Tasmanian Legislative Council in the electorate of Hobart from 10 May 1952 until her retirement on 22 May 1976.

Born Phyllis Allsopp, she married Albert Benjamin in Sydney on 10 March 1926.

In 1948, their daughter, Jill Benjamin, married Bill Neilson who went on to become Premier of Tasmania.

She stood for the division of Hobart as a Labor candidate when sitting member John Soundy retired on 10 May 1952. She won the division easily with 1,433 votes; the next highest candidate received only 563 votes.

Despite her sex, Benjamin was reported as one of the "36 faceless men" reported to be in control of the Australian Labor Party in the lead up to the 1963 Australian federal election.

From 1968 to 1969, Benjamin was Leader of the Government in the Legislative Council, as one of only four representatives of her party in that chamber. She was the first woman to hold the position in any Australian legislative council.

See also
List of the first women holders of political offices in Oceania

References

External links
 

1907 births
1996 deaths
Australian Labor Party members of the Parliament of Tasmania
Members of the Tasmanian Legislative Council
Officers of the Order of Australia
Members of the Order of the British Empire
20th-century Australian politicians
Women members of the Tasmanian Legislative Council
20th-century Australian women politicians